was a Japanese composer, pianist and conductor. Hayashi is considered to be one of the most renowned and accomplished Japanese composers of the postwar period. In particular, Hayashi was noted for his choral suite Scenes from Hiroshima (1958–2001).

In exploring the possibilities of Japanese language opera, Hayashi composed more than 30 operas. He was artistic director and resident composer of the Opera Theatre Konnyakuza. His oeuvre also includes symphonic works, works for band, chamber music, choral works, songs and more than 100 film scores. Hayashi was also the author of more than 20 books including Nihon opera no yume (日本オペラの夢 The Dream of Japanese Opera).

In 1998 Hayashi won the 30th Suntory Music Award.

Early life

Hikaru Hayashi was born in Tokyo on October 22, 1931. He was the cousin of renowned flautist Ririko Hayashi. Hayashi's father was a physician who had graduated from Keiō University Medical School, and had studied in Berlin before returning to Japan to take up a position as a professor at Nihon University. A musical prodigy, Hayashi began studying music under his father's friend, the famed composer Hisatada Otaka, at the age of 10, composing numerous full-length chamber music and orchestral works while still a child. Hayashi later entered Tokyo University of the Arts as a composition student but did not complete his studies.

Career

In 1953, Hayashi co-founded the "Goat Society" (山羊の会, Yagi no Kai) with other young composers such as Michio Mamiya and Yuzō Toyama. The aim of the society was to develop a new form of Japanese classical music different from wartime ultranationalist music. Over the course of the 1950s, the group increasingly became involved in left-wing politics. For example in 1958, when conservative prime minister Nobusuke Kishi attempted to pass a draconian Police Duties Bill to crack down on left-wing protesters, the Goat Society inserted a statement opposing the bill into the program of their fifth anniversary concert.

From 1959 to 1960, Hayashi participated in the Anpo protests against revision of the U.S.-Japan Security Treaty alongside other young composers, artists, and writers as part of the "Young Japan Society" (若い日本の会, Wakai Nihon no Kai). Hayashi was deeply affected by the failure of the protests to stop the treaty, and penned several ballads about the movement, including "6/15," a song in honor of the memory of Tokyo University student Michiko Kanba, who had been killed during the protests.

Immediately following the protests, Hayashi helped co-found the Seinen Geijutsu Gekijō ("Youth Art Theater"), which was one of the earliest theatre troupes in the Angura movement of radical, "underground" avant-garde theatre.

Beginning in the late 1950s, Hayashi became increasingly known for his innovative film scores, especially as part of his long-running collaboration with Japanese filmmaker Kaneto Shindo, beginning with his scoring of Shindo's film Daigo Fukuryū Maru, ("Lucky Dragon No. 5," 1959), which was based on the Lucky Dragon No. 5 nuclear fallout incident of 1954. For example, Hayashi created "harrowing" scores for the Shindo-directed horror films Onibaba ("Demon Hag," 1964) and Kuroneko ("The Black Cat," 1968) by combining taiko drums with the sound of human screams. Hayashi also collaborated with filmmaker Nagisa Ōshima, scoring Ōshima films such as Violence at Noon (1966), Band of Ninja (1967), and Death by Hanging (1968). Ultimately, Hayashi would go on to craft scores for more than 100 films.

In 1975, Hayashi was appointed artistic director and resident composer of the Opera Theatre Konnyakuza in Tokyo, a post he held until his death in 2012.

Later life and death

In September 2011, Hayashi collapsed in front of his home, hitting his head.  He was rushed to the hospital in an unresponsive state, where he received treatment for several months. He died on January 5, 2012, at the age of 80.

Selected works
Opera
 Gauche the Cellist (セロ弾きのゴーシュ) (1986); based on the novel by Kenji Miyazawa
 The Forest Is Alive (Mori wa ikite iru; 森は生きている) (1991), after the novel by Samuil Marshak — this opera has been unusually successful, with two complete recordings and regular revivals
 Metamorphosis (変身 セールスマンKの憂鬱) (1996); based on the short story by Franz Kafka
 I Am a Cat (吾輩は猫である) (1998); based on the novel by Natsume Sōseki
 Three Sisters (三人姉妹) (2001); based on the play by Anton Chekhov
 Revenge of the Dog (イヌの仇討ち あるいは吉良の決断) (2002); based on the novel by Hisashi Inoue
 Last Adventure of Don Quixote (花のラ・マンチャ騎士道 あるいはドン・キホーテ最後の冒険) (2004); based on the novel by Miguel de Cervantes
 Romeo and Juliet (瓦礫のなかのロミオ＆ジュリエット) (2006); based on the play by William Shakespeare

Orchestral
 Symphony in G (1953)
 Variations for Orchestra (1955)
 Festive Overture (祝典序曲) (1976)
 Symphony No.2 "Canciones" (1983)
 Fukinukeru Natsukaze no Matsuri (吹き抜ける夏風の祭) (1985); recorded 1988 DENON, The Contemporary Music of Japan, COCO-70960, Kyoto Symphony Orchestra, Koizumi, Kazuhiro conductor.
 Symphonic Sketch (シンフォニック・スケッチ) (1988–1992)
 Symphony No.3 "At Noon, the August Sun..." (1990)

Concertante
 Guitar Concerto (ギター協奏曲＜北の帆船＞)
 Viola Concerto "Elegia" (悲歌) for viola and string orchestra (1995)
 Xylophone Concerto (木琴協奏曲＜夏の雲はしる＞) (2007)

Chamber music
 Rhapsody for violin and piano (1965)
 Sonata for flute and piano (1967)
 Winter on 72nd St. (７２丁目の冬) for violin and piano (1968)
 String Quartet "Legende" (レゲンデ) (1989)
 Vines (蔓枝) for viola solo (1999)
 Viola Sonata "Process" (プロセス) for viola and piano (2002)

Piano
 Theme and Variations (主題と変奏) (1946)
 Rondo in G major (ロンド ト長調) (1950)
 Dance Suite (舞踏組曲) for 2 pianos (1954)
 Sonata [No.1] (1965)
 Sonatina (1966)
 The Diary of Dr. Pamir (パミール博士の日記) for piano 4-hands (1977)
 Bevat: Tuk-kui-gwa (徳利小) (1979)
 Blanqui (ブランキ) for piano 4-hands (1979)
 The Zoo (動物園) (1979)
 Attā-wanku-wantū (あったーわんくわとぅー) (1980)
 Garasa (がらさ) (1980)
 Modottekita hizuke (もどってきた日付) (1980)
 Sangitsu (さんぎつ) (1980)
 Sonata No.2 "About Trees" (「木々について) (1981)
 Tei-chi dei-chi denden (てぃーちでぃーる・じんじん Tīchi dīru jinjin) (1981)
 Mimichiri bōji (耳打り坊主) (1982)
 Warszawianka Variations (ワルシャヴィアンカ変奏曲) (1982)
 48 Songs for Piano (ピアノのための４８のうた) (1983)
 Harlequin (アルレッキーノ) for 2 pianos (1984)
 Shima-kodomo-uta II (Nursery Songs from Southern Islands II; 島こども歌２) (1984)
 Tori-tachi no hachigatsu (鳥たちの八月) for 2 pianos 8-hands (1984)
 Chameleon (カメレオン) for piano 4-hands (1986)
 Tale (ものがたり) (1986)
 Jikoku wo nozoku Arurekkīno (地獄を覗くアルレッキーノ) for 2 pianos (1987)
 Sonata No.3 "New Angel" (「新しい天使」) (1987)
 Postlude (POSTLUDE/静岡東高校校歌によるパラフレーズ), Paraphrase on the Shizuoka East High School Hymn (1992)
 Sōkō no mori (Forest of Drafts; 前奏曲「草稿の森」) (1993)
 四都 for 2 pianos (2000)
 Khanbaliq (カムバリク) for 2 pianos (2004)
 Dance Suite for 2 pianos (2004)
 3 Intermezzos (三つの間奏曲) (2006)..

Film scores
 Voice Without a Shadow (影なき声) (1958)
 The Naked Island (裸の島) (1960)
 Love Under the Crucifix (1962)
 Brave Records of the Sanada Clan (真田風雲録) (1963)
 Onibaba (1964)
 Kuroneko (藪の中の黒猫) (1968)
 Death by Hanging (絞死刑) (1968)
 Boy (少年) (1969)
 Under the Flag of the Rising Sun (軍旗はためく下に) (1972)
 A Last Note (午後の遺言状) (1995)
 Owl (ふくろう) (2003)
 Postcard (2010)

References

External links
 
 林光の部屋 – Hikaru Hayashi's Room (in Japanese)
 オペラシアター こんにゃく座 – Opera Theatre Konnyakuza (in Japanese and English)
 

1931 births
2012 deaths
20th-century classical composers
20th-century classical pianists
20th-century conductors (music)
20th-century Japanese composers
20th-century Japanese male musicians
21st-century classical composers
21st-century classical pianists
21st-century conductors (music)
21st-century Japanese composers
21st-century Japanese male musicians
Concert band composers
Japanese classical composers
Japanese classical pianists
Japanese conductors (music)
Japanese film score composers
Japanese male classical composers
Japanese male classical pianists
Japanese male conductors (music)
Japanese male film score composers
Japanese opera composers
Male opera composers